The 2018 U-19 Asia Rugby Championship is an international rugby union competition for Under 20 national teams in Asia. The competition was held in Taipei, Taiwan. The winners in Asia Rugby U19 Championship secured a berth at the 2019 World Rugby Under 20 Trophy.

Top division
The top division was held in Taipei, Taiwan from 12–18 December 2018 in a round-robin tournament format.

Table

Matches

All times are local (UTC+8).

Round 1

Round 2

Round 3

Division 1

Division 1 was hosted by the Thailand at the Bang-Bon Stadium in Bangkok from 11–14 December 2018. The winner will be promoted to the top division.

Matches

Semi-finals

3rd place playoff

Final

See also
 List of sporting events in Taiwan

References

2018 rugby union tournaments for national teams
rugby union
2018 in Asian rugby union
Asia Rugby Championship